The  is an art museum in Tokyo, Japan.

The museum is located in Minato ward, just east of Meguro Station. The Art Deco building, completed in 1933, has interiors designed by Henri Rapin and features decorative glass work by René Lalique.

History
The Tokyo Metropolitan Teien Art Museum building was previously the residence of Prince Asaka Yasuhiko and his family from 1933 to 1947. The prince, who studied at the École Spéciale Militaire de Saint-Cyr in France, and travelled to the United States in 1925, was greatly enamoured of the Art Deco movement. On his return to Japan he commissioned the construction of his own private residence in this style. Although many of the interiors were designed according to plans submitted by Henri Rapin, the main architect of the building itself is credited as Gondo Yukichi of the Works Bureau of the Imperial Household Ministry.

After World War II the building served as the official residence of the Prime Minister (1947–50), and as a State Guest House (1950–74). The residence was first opened to the public as a museum in 1983. It is one of Japan's many museums which are supported by a prefectural government. Teien means Japanese garden, and the museum is so named because the building is surrounded by a garden and sculptures.

Current facilities
After undergoing extensive renovation in 2013, the museum was re-opened in November 2014. The new museum annex, designed in collaboration with Hiroshi Sugimoto includes modern exhibition spaces, a café and museum shop.

Gallery

See also 
 Prefectural museum

References

External links

Tokyo Metropolitan Teien Art Museum: General information, English website.

Residential buildings completed in 1933
Museums established in 1983
1983 establishments in Japan
Art museums and galleries in Tokyo
Imperial residences in Japan
Art Deco architecture in Japan
Buildings and structures in Minato, Tokyo